Ahora is the debut studio album by American recording artist Chiquis Rivera, released on June 2, 2015 by Sweet Sound Records.

Ahora reached number-one on the Billboard Top Latin Albums and Billboard Regional Mexican Albums charts in the United States.

Recordings
The album consists of a mixture of uptempos and ballads, inspired by the pop and banda genres. As executive producer of the album, Chiquis took a wide role in its production, co-writing a majority of the songs, choosing which ones to produce and sharing ideas on the mixing and mastering of tracks.

Commercial reception
Ahora reached number one on the Billboard Top Latin Albums and Billboard Regional Mexican Albums charts in the United States. According to Billboard magazine, Rivera is the first female to top the chart since her late mother, Jenni Rivera, opened at No. 1 on Dec. 20, 2014 with the posthumous album 1 Vida - 3 Historias: Metamorfosis - Despedida de Culican - Jenni Vive 2013. According to Nielsen SoundScan, Ahora sold 7,000 copies in its first week of release. Ahora was certified gold (Latin field) by the Recording Industry Association of America (RIAA) for shipments of 30,000 copies.

Critical reception

Thom Jurek of Allmusic, gave the album three out of five stars and said, "...her [Chiquis'] bravery and growing sophistication that are most impressive." Angie Romero of Billboard also gave the album three out of five stars.

Track listing

Charts

Weekly charts

Year-end charts

Sales and certifications

See also
List of number-one Billboard Latin Albums from the 2010s

References

2015 debut albums
Chiquis Rivera albums
Spanish-language albums